The League for the Fourth International (LFI) is a Trotskyist international organization that has bases in Mexico, Brazil, Italy, the United States and Germany. All of these are very small and based in at most one or two cities. Like other international Trotskyist groups, it fights for "international socialist revolution, the conquest of power by the working class, led by its Leninist party."

History
Led by Jan Norden, it was formed by members who were expelled from the Spartacist League's international the International Communist League (Fourth Internationalist) on June 8, 1996 and the Grupo Espartaquista de México, forming the Internationalist Group. In addition to which the new Internationalist Group had links with the Liga Quarta-Internacionalista do Brasil which had been developing fraternal relations with the Spartacist League. The Liga Quarta-Internacionalista do Brasil, following the ICL's break of fraternal relations with it, signed with the Internationalist Group their "Joint Statement of Commitment to Reforge the Fourth International".

In early 1998, the ICL expelled the Permanent Revolution Faction from the Ligue trotskyste de France and at the same time declared that the key statement of the founding program of the Fourth International had been superseded.

In April 1998, the Internationalist Group, Liga Quarta-Internacionalista do Brasil and the Permanent Revolution Faction formed the League for the Fourth International, whose founding statement was Reforge the Fourth International (6 April 1998).  

In 2004, the LFI's Dutch section, consisting of only one member, left to join the International Bolshevik Tendency.

Actions
The leading member is Jan Norden, former editor of the Spartacist League newspaper Workers Vanguard and founder of the LFI's American section, the Internationalist Group. Their English language newspaper is called The Internationalist.

References

External links
League for the Fourth International

Trotskyist political internationals